The Rebel Set is a 1959 American crime drama film in black and white directed by Gene Fowler Jr. It was later featured and riffed on Mystery Science Theater 3000 in Season 4.

Plot summary 
Mr. Tucker (Platt), proprietor of a Los Angeles coffee house, hires three down-on-their-luck classic beatnik patrons: out-of-work actor John Mapes (Palmer); struggling writer Ray Miller (Lupton); and George Leland (Sullivan), the wayward son of movie star Rita Leland, to participate in an armored car robbery to take place during a four-hour stopover in Chicago during the trio's train trip from Los Angeles to New York. Mapes' worried wife Jeanne (Crowley) joins him on the train, concerned about his not having had a job in more than a year.

Tucker and his henchman Sidney (Glass) fly ahead to set up the robbery, which goes off without a hitch. John, Ray and George take the train to Chicago.  George shoots out a tire on the armored truck.  Then Sidney drives a car into the truck.  As the security guards get out to check the accident, John and Ray drive up disguised as policemen in a police car.  The three guards are tied up and the almost one million dollars is transferred into the fake police car.  The five then drive off to another site to bury their clothes, guns and other crime gear.  The money is placed into a gift box and entrusted to George.  The men continue on the train to New York.  Tucker promised the three $200,000 apiece.

However, once back on the train, Leland's greed gets the better of him and he decides to keep all of the money for himself.  John and Ray go to talk to him but find him murdered with a suicide note left behind.  Tucker has disguised himself as a man of the cloth and is on the train.  He double crosses the trio, first eliminating Leland and Miller next, leaving Mapes as the only one left to stop Tucker from getting away with murder and keeping the entire haul.

John confesses to his wife Jeanne his role in the robbery.  When the cops board the train in Newark to investigate the Leland murder, John confesses.  Tucker jumps from the train with the money and Mapes chases after him.  Two cops chase and fire shots.  Tucker and Mapes tangle all over and through the train railyard.  Finally, Tucker falls onto an electric transformer and dies while Mapes surrenders to police.  As Jeanne gives her husband a goodbye hug, movie star Rita Leland waits for her son George to arrive on the train, unaware that he is dead.

Cast

Soundtrack

External links 
 
 

1959 films
1959 crime drama films
1950s heist films
Allied Artists films
American black-and-white films
American crime drama films
American heist films
1950s English-language films
Films about the Beat Generation
Rail transport films
Films scored by Paul Dunlap
Films directed by Gene Fowler Jr.
1950s American films